= Parabolos =

Town of ancient Thrace

Coordinates: 41°03′09″N 29°01′50″E

Parabolos was a town of ancient Thrace on the Bosphorus, inhabited during Roman times.

Its site is located north of Defterdar Burnu in European Turkey.
